ALEUTIAN CURRENT Aleutian Current is also called the "Subarctic Current". An eastward flowing ocean current which lies north of the North Pacific Current; it is the northern branch of the Kuroshio Current which moves northeast then east between 40° N and 50° N. As it approaches the coast of North America it divides to form the northward-flowing Alaska Current and the southward-flowing California Current .

See also

References
 

Climate of Alaska
Currents of the Pacific Ocean
Water in Alaska